Aran va Bidgol County is in Isfahan province, Iran. The capital of the county is the city of Aran o Bidgol. At the 2006 census, the county's population was 89,961 in 24,541 households. The following census in 2011 counted 97,409 people in 28,902 households. At the 2016 census, the county's population was 103,517 in 32,050 households.

Administrative divisions

The population history of Aran va Bidgol County's administrative divisions over three consecutive censuses is shown in the following table. The latest census shows two districts, three rural districts, and four cities.

References

 

Counties of Isfahan Province